El Tambo may refer to:

 El Tambo, Cauca, Colombia
 El Tambo, Nariño, Colombia
 El Tambo Canton, Ecuador
 El Tambo, Chile, city in the O'Higgins Region
 El Tambo District, Huancayo province, Peru
 Tambo District, La Mar, Peru

See also
 Tambo (disambiguation)